The Ramallah and al-Bireh Governorate is one of 16  governorates of Palestine. It covers a large part of the central West Bank, on the northern border of the Jerusalem Governorate. Its district capital or muhfaza (seat) is the city of al-Bireh.

According to the Palestinian Central Bureau of Statistics (PCBS), the district had a population of 279,730 in 2007. Its governor is Dr Laila Ghannam, the first female governor.

Localities
According to PCBS, the governorate has 78 localities, including refugee camps, in its jurisdiction. 13 localities have the status of municipality.

Cities
Al-Bireh: 45,975
Ramallah: 38,998
Beitunia: 26,604
Rawabi: 710

Municipalities
The following localities in the Ramallah and al-Bireh Governorate have populations over 5,000.

Bani Zeid
Bani Zeid al-Sharqiya
Beit Liqya
Bir Zeit
Deir Ammar
Deir Dibwan
Deir Jarir
al-Ittihad
Kharbatha al-Misbah
al-Mazra'a ash-Sharqiya
Ni'lin
Silwad
Sinjil
Turmus Ayya
al-Zaitounah

Village councils
The following localities in the Ramallah and al-Bireh Governorate have populations of over 1,000.

Aboud
Abu Qash
Abwein
Ajjul
'Atara
Beitin
Bil'in
Beit Rima
Beit Sira
Beit Ur al-Fauqa
Beit Ur al-Tahta
Beitillu
Budrus
Burqa
Deir Ibzi
Deir Abu Mash'al
Deir Qaddis
Deir as-Sudan
Dura al-Qar
Ein 'Arik
Ein Qiniya
Ein Yabrud
al-Janiya
Jifna
Kafr Ein
Kafr Malik
Kafr Nima
Khirbet Abu Falah
Kobar
al-Lubban al-Gharbi
Mazra'a ash-Sharqiya
al-Midya
al-Mughayyir
Nabi Salih
Qarawat Bani Zeid
Qibya
Rammun
Rantis
Ras Karkar
Saffa
Shuqba
Surda
Taybeh
At-Tira

Refugee camps
Am'ari
Qalandia
Jalazone

See also
 Governorates of Palestine

References

 
Governorates of the Palestinian National Authority in the West Bank